Leslie Frosch is an American curler.

At the national level, she is a four-time United States women's champion curler (1979, 1981, 1983, 1988). She competed for the United States at four .

Teams

Women's

Mixed doubles

Personal life
Her sister Nancy Richard (Langley) is also a curler. They played together in several US championships and Worlds.

References

External links 

 National Champions | Granite Curling Club of Seattle
 
 

Living people
American female curlers
American curling champions
Year of birth missing (living people)
Place of birth missing (living people)